Trieste City Hall is the seat of the city and commune of Trieste in Italy.

History 
The building, designed by architect Giuseppe Bruni, was erected between 1873 and 1875, when Trieste was part of Austria-Hungary. Bruni's project had been chosen because it had the adavantage to stay within the planned budget and to easily fit the old building previously located there. Construction works were supervisioned by Eugenio Geiringer.

In 1938, Italian dictator Benito Mussolini announced the promulgation of the Italian racial laws from a stage located right in front of the building.

Description 
The building is located on the large Piazza Unità d'Italia with its main façade facing the sea. It features an eclectic style.

Gallery

References

External links

Buildings and structures in Trieste
Trieste